Bucklin Township is a township in Ford County, Kansas, USA.  As of the 2000 census, its population was 900.

Geography
According to the United States Geological Survey, it contains two cemeteries: Bucklin and Pleasant Valley.

Transportation
Bucklin Township contains one airport or landing strip, Bucklin Airfield.

References

 USGS Geographic Names Information System (GNIS)

External links
 US-Counties.com
 City-Data.com

Townships in Ford County, Kansas
Townships in Kansas